John Henry Smith (1848–1911) was a member of the Quorum of the Twelve Apostles and the First Presidency of The Church of Jesus Christ of Latter-day Saints.

John Henry Smith may also refer to:

 J. H. Smith (mayor) (1858–1956), mayor of Everett, Washington and co-founder of Anchorage, Alaska
 John Henry Smith (politician) (1881–1953), Australian politician
 John Henry Smith (reporter) (21st century), American sports journalist
 John H. Smith (bishop) (1939–2012), bishop of the Episcopal Diocese of West Virginia